"Feelin' Myself" is a song by American recording artist will.i.am featuring Miley Cyrus, French Montana, Wiz Khalifa & DJ Mustard. It was released on November 26, 2013,  by Interscope Records as the lead single from the re-release of will.i.am's fourth studio album #willpower (2013). It was written and additional produced by DJ Mustard, and Mike Free, with additional songwriting provided by will.i.am, Khalifa, Montana, and Jean-Baptiste. An accompanying music video was premiered on November 26, 2013. The song sounds very similar to "Gettin Tho'd" by fellow American rapper Paul Wall, which is also produced by DJ Mustard himself. The song peaked at number ninety-six on the Billboard Hot 100. Outside the United States, the song peaked within the top ten of the charts in Belgium, the Republic of Ireland and the United Kingdom.

Feelin' Myself has French Montana rapping the first verse, will.i.am rapping the second verse, Cyrus rapping the third verse and Wiz rapping the last verse. Cyrus and will.i.am perform the chorus together.

Background
"Feelin' Myself" marks the last of three collaborations between will.i.am and Cyrus in 2013. She first appeared on his track "Fall Down" for the original version of his fourth studio album, #willpower (2013). will.i.am later appeared as a songwriter and producer on the track "Do My Thang" for Cyrus' fourth studio album, Bangerz (2013).

The song was also featured in a commercial for Samsung's Milk Music app, which was later discontinued.

Critical reception
Lewis Corner of Digital Spy gave the song a moderate review stating: "The final result may be devoid of any musical credibility, but it's annoyingly catchy - and much like will.i.am's strange anti-carb diet shoutout, we've got a feeling this is going to be just as hard to give up in 2014."  Spin wrote the song features "bleepy, stripped-bare production from ratchet-music man of the hour DJ Mustard".
James Shotwell of Under the Gun Review felt that the collaboration with the featured artists "didn't bring anything to the table you haven't heard before, and most of it has been said better on at least a dozen other songs. Will.i.am has gone from being on the forefront of pop music to barely staying on the bandwagon, and it’s getting more disappointing with each release."

Music video
An accompanying music video for "Feelin' Myself," directed by Michael Jurkovac with graphic designer Pasha Shapiro, was premiered through Vevo on November 26, 2013. All four artists appear in the video.

Track listing
Digital download
"Feelin' Myself" (featuring Miley Cyrus, Wiz Khalifa, French Montana and DJ Mustard) (Explicit)
"Feelin' Myself" (featuring Miley Cyrus, Wiz Khalifa, French Montana and DJ Mustard) (Clean)

Charts

Weekly charts

Year-end charts

Certifications

References

2013 songs
2013 singles
French Montana songs
Miley Cyrus songs
Will.i.am songs
Wiz Khalifa songs
Song recordings produced by Mustard (record producer)
Songs written by Mustard (record producer)
Songs written by will.i.am
Songs written by Wiz Khalifa
Songs written by Jean-Baptiste (songwriter)
Songs written by French Montana